Fernando Guillén Cuervo (born March 11, 1963) is a Spanish actor, film director and scriptwriter.

Biography 
Born on March 11, 1963, in Barcelona in a family of thespians to father Fernando Guillén and mother Gemma Cuervo. Cayetana (also an actress) and Natalia are his siblings. He featured as a child actor in the television series La saga de los Rius (1976–1977). He began his professional career in theatre, working as an assistant stage director at the Madrid's .

He made his feature film debut as a director in the 2000 film , which he co-directed alongside Karra Elejalde. He co-wrote the script of the 2002 LGTB film Bulgarian Lovers alongside Eloy de la Iglesia, adapting the novel Los novios búlgaros by Eduardo Mendicutti. His first solo film as a director was the 2006 comedy .

He was married to Elena González from 1996 to 2011. He married actress Ana Milán in 2014. They signed their divorce in January 2016.

Filmography

Television

References

External links

1963 births
Living people
Male actors from Barcelona
Spanish male film actors
Spanish male telenovela actors
20th-century Spanish male actors
21st-century Spanish male actors
Male film actors from Catalonia
Male television actors from Catalonia